Theodor Olsen Aaset (3 July 1862 – ??) was a Norwegian politician for the Labour Party.

He was born at Aaset in Grue as a forester's son. He worked as a carpenter and smallholder in Grue. In 1904 he was elected to the executive committee of Grue municipal council, and during the term 1913–1915 he served as a deputy representative to the Parliament of Norway from the constituency Solør. When regular representative August Embretsen died in late 1914, Aaset took his seat in Parliament.

References

1862 births
Year of death missing
Members of the Storting
Hedmark politicians
People from Grue, Norway